Harting Downs is a  biological Site of Special Scientific Interest west of Midhurst in West Sussex.

This site consists of several parallel valleys on the steep slope of the South Downs. Habitats are chalk grassland, which is being invaded by scrub, together with areas of long-established woodland. The site is important for insects, with a nationally rare snail, Helicondonta obvoluta, two uncommon moths, the wood tiger and the maple prominent, and many rove beetles.

References

Sites of Special Scientific Interest in West Sussex
Local Nature Reserves in West Sussex 
Nature Conservation Review sites